Cicely Tyson was an African American actress noted for her groundbreaking work in film, television and theatre.

Filmography 
Sources:

Film

Television

Theatre

Radio

References

External links

 
Interview titled Ms. Cicely Tyson's Fact-Finding Tour of Central Africa, 1985-11-05, In Black America, KUT Radio, American Archive of Public Broadcasting (WGBH and the Library of Congress)
Cicely Tyson at Find a Grave

Actress filmographies
American filmographies